Michael John Jirschele (born March 3, 1959) is an American professional baseball coach. He is the former third base coach for the Kansas City Royals of Major League Baseball (MLB).

He previously served as manager of the Omaha Storm Chasers baseball team, with 12 total seasons in Omaha and fifteen as a minor league manager. He also played minor league baseball for 13 seasons.

Personal life
Jirschele is one of eight children. His three brothers, Doug, Pete and Jim, all suffered from muscular dystrophy and died in their 40s.

For a number of years he worked with a furniture store in the baseball off-season.

He and his wife, Sheri, have three children and four grandchildren.

Player
Jirschele went to high school in Clintonville, Wisconsin. He was named as an all-state quarterback on the football team and pursued by the Wisconsin Badgers football team.

After graduating high school, he was drafted by the Texas Rangers in the fifth round of the 1977 draft.

An infielder, Jirschele played minor league baseball from 1977 through 1985 and from 1987 to 1990, hitting .225 with 102 doubles, 31 triples and 35 home runs in 999 games. He played at the Triple-A level for six seasons but never reached the major leagues.

Manager and coach
Jirschele began his minor league managing career in 1992, heading the GCL Royals in the Gulf Coast League and leading them to the league championship. In 1993, he managed the Rockford Royals of the Midwest League, and in 1994 he managed the Wilmington Blue Rocks of the Carolina League, leading them to the league championship. From 1995 to 1997 and from 2003 to 2011 he has managed the Omaha Storm Chasers franchise, known as the Royals through the 2010 season.

On May 23, 2011, Jirschele won his 1,000th game as a minor league manager and was later named the winner of the 2011 Mike Coolbaugh Award as the minor league manager of the year.

On October 25, 2013, Jirschele was announced as a coach for the Kansas City Royals for the 2014 season. Later, he became the Royals' third-base coach and has remained so into the 2018 season.

In Game 7 of the 2014 World Series, with the Royals down by one run with two outs in the bottom of the ninth against San Francisco Giants ace Madison Bumgarner, Alex Gordon hit a single to left field at which left fielder Gregor Blanco misplayed the ball and Gordon advanced to third base where Jirschele stopped him. The next batter was catcher Salvador Pérez, who popped out to third baseman Pablo Sandoval in foul territory to end the game and the series. Fans hotly debated whether Jirschele should have sent Gordon home. The Kansas City Star tested this out with a college baseball team, and five of six times, the runner was out (the one time the runner was safe was the fault of an overthrow).

The Royals returned to the playoffs in 2015 after winning the American League Central. In Game 6 of the American League Championship Series, after the Royals had given away a two-run lead and allowed the Toronto Blue Jays to tie the game, Eric Hosmer singled to right field with Lorenzo Cain on first base. When Blue Jays right fielder José Bautista threw to second base, Jirschele sent Cain home to score the run that would send the Royals back to the World Series, where they defeated the New York Mets in five games to win the team's second championship.

As of 2021, Jirschele is bench coach for the High-A Quad Cities River Bandits. Following the 2021 season, Jirschele along with 2021 River Bandits manager Chris Widger were transferred to the Royal's AA Affiliate the Northwest Arkansas Naturals. Jirschele maintained his role as bench coach.

References

External links

Retrosheet

1959 births
Living people
People from Clintonville, Wisconsin
Baseball coaches from Wisconsin
Baseball players from Wisconsin
Major League Baseball third base coaches
Kansas City Royals coaches
Minor league baseball managers
Gulf Coast Rangers players
Asheville Tourists players
Wausau Timbers players
Tulsa Drillers players
Denver Bears players
Oklahoma City 89ers players
Omaha Royals players
Memphis Chicks players
Appleton Foxes players